The Complete Bitches Brew Sessions is a four-disc box set of music recordings by trumpeter Miles Davis.  The set collects all tracks Davis recorded between August 19, 1969, and February 6, 1970, including the 1970 double album Bitches Brew in its entirety.  However, the title of the box set is somewhat of a misnomer: outside of the Bitches Brew tracks themselves, none of the other tracks were recorded during the same August 1969 sessions that resulted in Bitches Brew. Furthermore, additional material recorded for, but not used in Bitches Brew (mainly rehearsal takes and unedited performances of the six album tracks), is not included in this set (though they later appeared on bootleg recordings titled Deep Brew Vol. 1 and Vol. 2).

When questioned by Paul Tingen why most of the material in fact was not recorded either for or at the same sessions as the original album, re-issue producer Bob Belden clarified how the team's thought process went. According to him and the engineer, all the songs Miles Davis recorded between August 1969 and early February 1970 used very similar line-ups to those on Bitches Brew, and the main thing they all had in common was the emphasis on keyboards. Every song in the set includes two to three keyboard players, most often Chick Corea, Joe Zawinul and Herbie Hancock. It was not until late February 1970 that Davis refined his concept by dropping the multiple electric pianists for a more guitar-heavy sound. Those following sessions were collected on The Complete Jack Johnson Sessions.

The box set includes some tracks that had never been previously released, one of which, the Wayne Shorter composition "Feio," has since appeared as a bonus track on late compact disc reissues of Bitches Brew. A few of the other tracks in the box set had previously appeared on the albums Live-Evil, Big Fun, and Circle in the Round.

Engineer [Original Recording] – Frank Laico (tracks: 2-3 to 2-6), Stan Tonkel (tracks: 1-1 to 2-2, 3-1 to 4-5)

The Complete Bitches Brew Sessions is number "6" in a series of Miles Davis box sets issued by Columbia Records/Legacy Records/Sony Music (the numbering scheme refers to the chronological order of the original recordings, not the release order of the box sets themselves).  The set was reissued on 11 May 2004 with new packaging. Mosaic Records released the 6 LP set.

Track listing
All songs written by Miles Davis, except where noted.

Personnel 
Collective listing for all recording sessions.
Miles Davis - Trumpet, Vocals
Don Alias - Percussion, Conga, Drums
Khalil Balakrishna - Sitar
Harvey Brooks - Bass, Electric bass
Ron Carter - Bass
Billy Cobham - Drums, Triangle
Chick Corea - Electric piano
Jack DeJohnette - Drums
Steve Grossman - Soprano saxophone
Herbie Hancock - Electric piano
Dave Holland - Bass, Electric bass
Bennie Maupin - Bass clarinet
John McLaughlin - Electric Guitar
Airto Moreira - Berimbau, Cuíca, Percussion
Bihari Sharma - Tabla, Tamboura
Wayne Shorter - Soprano saxophone
Juma Santos (Jim Riley) - Conga, Shaker
Lenny White - Drums
Larry Young - Organ, Celeste, Electric piano
Joe Zawinul - Electric piano

References 

 Belden, Bob and Michael Cuscuna. "Discography/Album Index." The Complete Bitches Brew Sessions by Miles Davis. Sony Music Entertainment C4K 65570, 1998.

External links
 Article by Paul Tingen about the making of the Complete Bitches Brew Sessions boxed set at Miles Beyond

Albums produced by Teo Macero
Albums produced by Michael Cuscuna
Albums produced by Bob Belden
Miles Davis compilation albums
1998 compilation albums
Columbia Records compilation albums
Albums recorded at CBS 30th Street Studio